Swissvale, Colorado is a small, rural unincorporated community in western Fremont County, Colorado, United States. It is located along U.S. Route 50.

See also

References

External links

Unincorporated communities in Fremont County, Colorado
Unincorporated communities in Colorado
Colorado populated places on the Arkansas River